Fernando "Cobo" Pereira is a major in the military of São Tomé and Príncipe.

Coup 

He led a coup against the elected government of Fradique de Menezes on July 16, 2003, while the latter was out of the country. He relinquished power a week later as part of an agreement.

Family

Pereira "is of mixed Cape Verdian and Angolan descent."

He is the father of ten children.

References

See also

 Fradique de Menezes#Career

Heads of state of São Tomé and Príncipe
Leaders who took power by coup
Living people
São Tomé and Príncipe military personnel
São Tomé and Príncipe people of Cape Verdean descent
São Tomé and Príncipe people of Angolan descent
São Tomé and Príncipe Roman Catholics
Year of birth missing (living people)
21st-century São Tomé and Príncipe politicians